Chenopodium preissii is a plant in the Amaranthaceae family, native to Western Australia and South Australia.

It was first described by Alfred Moquin-Tandon in 1849 as Rhagodia preissii, and this is the name accepted by the Council of Heads of Australasian Herbaria.  However, in 1904 Ludwig Diels transferred it to the genus, Chenopodium, and Chenopodium preissii is the name accepted by Plants of the World online.

References

External links
Chenopodium preissii occurrence data from the Australasian Virtual Herbarium

preissii

Flora of Western Australia

Flora of South Australia
Taxa named by Alfred Moquin-Tandon
Plants described in 1849